"Lion Heart" is a song recorded by South Korean girl group Girls' Generation for their fifth studio album of the same name. It was released as the album's title track by SM Entertainment on August 18, 2015.

Composition

"Lion Heart" was described as a soul pop-inspired bubblegum pop song by Billboard. It embraces a 1960s American retro sound and has a jazzy melody as well as "an ear-grabbing bass line". Lyrically, the song talks about women falling in love with men who have a cheating heart and how they try to tame him like taming a lion.

Music video
The music video was released on August 18, 2015. The music video narrates a story where the members of Girls' Generation each fall in love with a male protagonist, who turns out to be the same man. They become upset and team up against him. The song was choreographed by the American choreographer Tony Testa & SM Entertainment's choreographer Shim Jaewon. It became third most viewed music video on YouTube by a South Korean act in August 2015.

Reception
Billboard praised the song for its retro themes and shifting of member roles saying "But what is new, musically, is the division of lines -- namely when Yuri, a member who typically only chimes in with a line or two, gets to handle a majority of the second chorus. It's a decision that further shows how Girls' Generation is embracing change in their eighth year..." The song was deemed the 7th best K-pop single of 2015 by PopMatters. Meanwhile, Idolator chose it as the 24th best K-pop song of the year.

Charts

Year-end chart

Sales

Awards and nominations

Release history

Credits 
Credits are adapted from Lion Heart liner notes.

Studio 
 SM Blue Ocean Studio – recording
 SM Blue Cup Studio – recording
 SM Concert Hall Studio – mixing
 Ingrid Studio – recording, digital editing
 MonoTree Studio – recording, additional vocal editing
 Sterling Sound – mastering

Personnel 

 SM Entertainment – executive producer
 Lee Soo-man – producer
 Kim Young-min – executive supervisor
 Girls' Generation – vocals
 Taeyeon – background vocals
 Jeon Ji-eun – lyrics
 Hwang Seon-jeong – lyrics
 Kim Jeong-mi – lyrics
 Choi So-young – lyrics
 Joy Factory – lyrics
 Hwang Hyun – lyrics, vocal directing, recording, Pro Tools operating
 Sean Alexander – composition
 Darren "Baby Dee Beats" Smith – composition, arrangement
 Claudia Brant – composition
 Avenue 52 – arrangement
 Shin Agnes – background vocals
 Kim Cheol-sun – recording
 Jung Eui-seok – recording
 Jung Eun-kyung – recording, digital editing
 Choo Dae-kwan – additional vocal editing
 Nam Koong-jin – mixing
 Tom Coyne – mastering

References

External links 
 

Girls' Generation songs
2015 singles
2015 songs
SM Entertainment singles
Songs written by Sean Alexander
Songs written by Claudia Brant